Nipponaphera quasilla is a species of sea snail, a marine gastropod mollusk in the family Cancellariidae, the nutmeg snails.

Description
The shell size is 25 mm

Distribution
This species is distributed along Somalia; Southern India and Southern Burma

References

 Bouchet P. & Petit R.E. (2008). New species and new records of southwest Pacific Cancellariidae. The Nautilus 122(1): 1–18.

quasilla
Gastropods described in 1987